Newberg School District (29J) is a public school district headquartered in Newberg in the U.S. state of Oregon. The main office is located at 714 E. Sixth Street in Newberg.

It is mostly in Yamhill County, where it serves the cities of Newberg and Dundee. Portions are in Clackamas County and Washington County.

Demographics
In the 2009 school year, the district had 156 students classified as homeless by the Department of Education, or 3.0% of students in the district.

School Board 
There are seven school board members, each serving four-year terms.

Schools

Elementary schools
Mabel Rush Elementary School
Joan Austin Elementary School
Antonia Crater Elementary School
Edwards Elementary School
Ewing Young Elementary School
Dundee Elementary School

Middle schools
Mountain View Middle School
Chehalem Valley Middle School

High school
Newberg High School

Controversies
The Newberg School District made news headlines for voting to ban "political" symbols from school grounds, including Pride and Black Lives Matter imagery. This ban ended in 2023.

An elementary school employee of the district reported to work wearing blackface in "protest" of the COVID-19 vaccine mandate. The employee was terminated from her position.

References

External links
Newberg Public Schools (official website)

School districts in Oregon
Education in Clackamas County, Oregon
Education in Washington County, Oregon
Education in Yamhill County, Oregon
Newberg, Oregon